The 1978 World Orienteering Championships, the 7th World Orienteering Championships, were held in Kongsberg, Norway, 15–17 September 1978.

The championships had four events; individual contests for men and women, and relays for men and women.

Medalists

Results

Men's individual

Women's individual

References 

World Orienteering Championships
World Orienteering Championships
International sports competitions hosted by Norway
World Orienteering Championships
Orienteering in Norway